Livezile (until 1960 Iad;) is a commune located in Bistrița-Năsăud County, Transylvania, Romania. It is composed of five villages: Cușma (Kusma), Dorolea (Aszúbeszterce), Dumbrava (Dumbráva), Livezile and Valea Poenii (Bureaka).

References

Communes in Bistrița-Năsăud County
Localities in Transylvania